Rosa Rademakers, Ph.D., is a neurogeneticist and professor within the Department of Neuroscience at the Mayo Clinic. Her research centers on the genetic basis of neurodegenerative diseases, such as identifying causal genes and their function, exploring familial risk factors, and the mechanism of the degeneration. Her neurodegenerative diseases of focus include "Alzheimer's disease (AD), frontotemporal dementia (FTD) and amyotrophic lateral sclerosis (ALS)." She received a Bachelor of Arts in Biology, a Master of Arts in Biochemistry, and a Ph.D. in Science, all from the University of Antwerp. Originally from the Netherlands, she came to the Mayo Clinic in 2005 for a post-doctoral fellowship, and in 2007 she was given a lab director position.

Scientific research focus areas 
Rademakers has researched mutations within genetic regulators of progranulin (GRN), which can cause early-onset dementia. She worked to develop a test to identify carriers of this mutation. This blood test identifies mutations in order to detect and understand the gene's regulation.

Her lab has also researched a mutation within the C9orf72 gene that contributes to the development of ALS and FTD. Her research discovered that this is the genetic basis for a majority of ALS and FTD cases. She received the 2016 Potamkin Prize based on this research.

Rademakers is working on research of causal genes and disease mechanisms of early-onset Alzheimer's disease. Her research team aims to sequence parts of the genome of patients with the disease in order to identify novel potential causes. She has also worked to sequence genes related to FTD.

Rademakers is also researching tau protein accumulation by whole-genome sequencing of families.

Notable professional achievements 

 Rademakers has filed six patents for detection and treatment of dementia
 Rademakers has been a contributing author on over 300 peer-reviewed academic journal articles
Committee Member of the National Centralized Repository for Alzheimer's Disease and Related Dementias Executive Committee
Mildred A. and Henry Uihlein II Professor of Medical Research at the Mayo Clinic College of Medicine

Awards and honors 

2016 Potamkin Prize
 2017 Research Program Award (R35) from the National Institute of Neurological Disorders and Stroke

References 

Living people
Year of birth missing (living people)
University of Antwerp alumni
Mayo Clinic people
American women neuroscientists
Dutch women neuroscientists
Dutch geneticists
American medical researchers
Dutch medical researchers
Alzheimer's disease researchers
21st-century American women
21st-century women scientists
Dutch emigrants to the United States